Lophogobius is a small genus of gobies native to the Pacific and western Atlantic oceans.

Species
There are currently 2 recognized species in this genus:
 Lophogobius cristulatus Ginsburg, 1939
 Lophogobius cyprinoides (Pallas, 1770) (Crested goby)

References

Gobiidae